is a train station located in Ōnojō, Fukuoka.

Lines 

Nishi-Nippon Railroad
Tenjin Ōmuta Line

Adjacent stations 

|-
|colspan=5 style="text-align:center;" |Nishi-Nippon Railroad

History 
On 28 August 2022, the facilities were moved to a new elevated station as part of a grade separation project.

References

Railway stations in Fukuoka Prefecture
Railway stations in Japan opened in 1944